The 1956–57 season was Colchester United's 15th season in their history and their seventh season in the Third Division South, the third tier of English football. Alongside competing in the Third Division South, the club also participated in the FA Cup in which the club were eliminated by Southend United in the first round in the first Essex derby in a cup competition. The season would be Colchester United's highest league finish for 50 years by ending their campaign in third position. It has only been bettered on three occasions; the 2005–06 season, 2006–07 season and the 2007–08 season.

Season overview
The 1956–57 season proved to be Colchester United's best finish in their history, ending the season in third position in the third tier with a result that was not bettered until 2006. For the majority of the season, Colchester were favourites for promotion, during which time they went 20 league games unbeaten between December 1956 and Easter 1957.

Colchester and rivals Ipswich Town vied for the top spot for much of the season. Colchester were seven-points ahead of their third-placed rivals when the two sides met at Layer Road on 16 February 1957. A record crowd of 18,559 witnessed the 0–0 draw, with over 4,000 fans turned away and over 100 spectators witnessing the action from the roof of the Popular Side stand. Player-manager Benny Fenton missed a 21st-minute penalty during the match, which was saved by Ipswich goalkeeper Roy Bailey.

A 2–1 win over second-placed Torquay United, who trailed by four points as a result, improved Colchester's title credentials. However, the loss of influential players to injury including Bob Dale and Chic Milligan damaged Colchester's hopes. Three consecutive draws in late March and early April allowed Torquay to close the gap to just one point, with Ipswich five points adrift. Over Easter 1957, Colchester lost three consecutive away games at Millwall, Walsall and Swindon Town, but won their final game of the season 2–0 against Watford to put them back at the top of the table, but both Ipswich and Torquay's final matches were 24 hours later. Both sides won their final games, with Colchester slipping to third position in the table and Ipswich were promoted as champions, level on points with Torquay but with a better goal average, while they finished one point ahead of Colchester. Colchester played the entire season unbeaten at Layer Road.

Players

Transfers

In

 Total spending:  ~ £3,500

Out

Match details

Third Division South

Results round by round

League table

Matches

FA Cup

Squad statistics

Appearances and goals

|-
!colspan="14"|Players who appeared for Colchester who left during the season

|}

Goalscorers

Clean sheets
Number of games goalkeepers kept a clean sheet.

Player debuts
Players making their first-team Colchester United debut in a fully competitive match.

See also
List of Colchester United F.C. seasons

References

General
Books

Websites

Specific

1956-57
English football clubs 1956–57 season